Coleophora ofaistoni is a moth of the family Coleophoridae. It is found in the lower Volga area in southern Russia.

The larvae feed on Ofaiston monandrum.

References

ofaistoni
Moths described in 2005
Moths of Europe